Michael Frolík (born 17 February 1988) is a Czech professional ice hockey right winger who is currently playing with HC Bílí Tygři Liberec in the Czech Extraliga.

Frolík has played in the NHL with the Florida Panthers, the organization that drafted him tenth overall in 2006, as well as the Chicago Blackhawks, with whom he won the Stanley Cup in 2013. He has also had stints with the Winnipeg Jets, Calgary Flames, Buffalo Sabres and Montreal Canadiens.

Playing career

Amateur
As a youth, Frolík  played in the 2002 Quebec International Pee-Wee Hockey Tournament with a team from Chomutov.

Frolík played two seasons in the Czech Extraliga for Rabat Kladno before being selected tenth overall in the 2006 NHL Entry Draft by the Florida Panthers. While playing in Kladno, Frolík was nicknamed "The Baby Jágr" due to his similar playing style and appearance to Jaromír Jágr, who also played for Kladno earlier in his career. To add to his overwhelming resemblance, Frolík, who cites Jágr as his role model, wore #68 at the Panthers' rookie camp.

Beginning in the 2006–07 season, Frolík began his North American career playing at the major junior level for the Rimouski Océanic of the Quebec Major Junior Hockey League (QMJHL).

Professional

Florida Panthers
Frolík made his NHL debut for Florida during the 2008–09 season, in which he finished with 21 goals and 24 assists for 45 points in 79 games. Frolik recorded 43 points the following season.

Chicago Blackhawks
On 9 February 2011, during Frolík's third season with the Panthers, in 2010–11, he was traded to the Chicago Blackhawks (along with goaltender Alexander Salák) in exchange for Jack Skille, Hugh Jessiman and David Pacan. Frolík scored his first goal as a Blackhawk on 2 March 2011, against the Calgary Flames. On 24 April, he scored the first Stanley Cup playoff penalty shot in Blackhawks history against goaltender Cory Schneider of the Vancouver Canucks in Game 6 of the Western Conference Quarterfinals.

On 15 July 2011, Frolík signed a three-year contract extension with the Blackhawks at an annual average value of $2.333 million. During the 2012–13 NHL lockout, Frolík played for Piráti Chomutov of the Czech Extraliga. On 27 May 2013, during the 2013 playoffs, he scored the second playoff penalty shot goal of his career against Jimmy Howard of the Detroit Red Wings, becoming the first player in NHL history to score more than one career penalty shot goal in the playoffs. He ultimately scored ten points in the playoffs en route to the Blackhawks' Stanley Cup victory over the Boston Bruins in six games.

Winnipeg Jets

In the subsequent off-season, on 30 June 2013, Frolík was traded to the Winnipeg Jets in exchange for a third- and fifth-round pick at the 2013 NHL Entry Draft. In the 2013–14 season opener on 2 October 2013, at Rexall Place against the Edmonton Oilers, Frolík scored twice in a 5–4 Winnipeg win. On 29 July 2014, Frolík and the Jets agreed on a one-year, $3.3 million contract. He finished with 19 goals and 23 assists on in the regular season, but was held pointless during the Jets' four-game sweep at the hands of the Anaheim Ducks in the 2015 playoffs.

Calgary Flames
On 1 July 2015, Frolík, as an unrestricted free agent, signed a five-year, $21 million contract with the Calgary Flames at an annual average value of $4.3 million.

Buffalo Sabres 
During his final year under contract with the Flames in the 2019–20 season, unable to replicate his offensive production from previous years with 10 points through 38 games, Frolik was traded by the Flames to the Buffalo Sabres in exchange for a fourth-round pick in 2020 on 2 January 2020.

Montreal Canadiens
On 23 December 2020, Frolík signed as a free agent to a one-year, $750,000 contract with the Montreal Canadiens.

St. Louis Blues
As a free agent over the summer and approaching the  season, Frolík accepted an invitation to attend the St. Louis Blues training camp on a Professional Tryout contract on 18 September 2021.

Lausanne HC
On 15 October 2021, Frolík joined Lausanne HC of the National League (NL) on a two-year deal through the 2022/23 season.

Personal life
His wife is former Miss Czech Republic 2001, model and TV/radio personality Diana Kobzanová. They have two daughters together.

Career statistics

Regular season and playoffs

International

References

External links

1988 births
Buffalo Sabres players
Calgary Flames players
Chicago Blackhawks players
Czech ice hockey right wingers
Florida Panthers draft picks
Florida Panthers players
Ice hockey players at the 2014 Winter Olympics
Rytíři Kladno players
Lausanne HC players
Laval Rocket players
Living people
Montreal Canadiens players
National Hockey League first-round draft picks
Olympic ice hockey players of the Czech Republic
Sportspeople from Kladno
Piráti Chomutov players
Rimouski Océanic players
Stanley Cup champions
Winnipeg Jets players
Ice hockey players at the 2022 Winter Olympics
Czech expatriate ice hockey players in the United States
Czech expatriate ice hockey players in Canada
Czech expatriate ice hockey players in Switzerland